Sloane Avenue Mansions is a high-rise residential building in Sloane Avenue, Chelsea, London, England. It stands next to Nell Gwynn House, designed by the same architect.

History
At the beginning of the 20th century, the area comprised derelict houses. By the 1930s, the area was revitalized, by tearing down those houses and erecting new buildings.

Its construction began in 1931, and it was completed in 1933. It was designed in the Art Deco architectural style by G. Kay Green. It is 35.00 metre high, with 11 storeys.

References

Chelsea, London
Residential buildings in London
Residential buildings completed in 1933
1933 establishments in England
Art Deco architecture in London